Carbon disulfide hydrolase is an enzyme with a molecular mass of 23,576 Da. The enzyme is hexadecameric.  It catalyzes the hydrolysis of carbon disulfide.

Carbon disulfide occurs naturally in the mudpots of volcanic solfataras. It is a precursor to hydrogen sulfide, which is an electron donor. The hyperthermophilic Acidianus strain was found to convert CS2 into H2S and CO2.

The enzyme is similar to that of carbonic anhydrases. The enzyme monomer of CS2 hydrolase displays a typical β-carbonic anhydrase fold and active site. Two of these monomers form a closely intertwined dimer with a central β-sheet capped by an α-helical domain. Four dimers form a square octameric ring through interactions of the long arms at the N and C termini. Similar ring structures have been seen in strains of carbonic anhydrases, however, in CS2 hydrolase is an enzyme consisting of two octameric rings form a hexadecamer by interlocking at right angles to each other. This results in the blocking of the entrance to the active site and the formation of a single 15-Å-long, highly hydrophobic tunnel that functions as a specificity filter. This provides a key difference between carbonic anhydrase and CS2 hydrolase. This tunnel determines the enzyme's substrate specificity for CS2, which is hydrophobic as well.

Mechanism

This hydrolase converts CS2 into H2S.  The process is similar to the hydration of CO2 by carbonic anhydrase. This similarity points to a likely mechanism. The zinc at the active site is tetrahedral, being coordinated by Cys 35, His 88, Cys 91 and water.  The water is deprotonated to give a zinc hydroxide that adds the substrate to give a Zn-O-C(S)SH intermediate.  A similar process is proposed to convert COS into .
CS2 + H2O → COS + H2S
COS + H2O → CO2 + H2S

The apoenzyme form, lacking the zinc cofactor, has a molecular weight of 382815.4 g/mol. The chloride ion and the 3,6,9,12,15,18,21,24,27,30,33,36,39-tridecaoxahentetracontane-1,41-diol (C28H58O15) are the two main ligands seen on the enzyme in this form. There are 16 polymer chains seen in this form contributing to the heaviness of the enzyme. This form is also sometimes termed the selenomethionine form.

References

Enzymes